The Bronwood Calaboose is a calaboose built in 1900 in Bronwood, Georgia. It was listed on the National Register of Historic Places in 1982.

It was deemed "significant as a rare and intact example of a turn-of-the-century wooden municipal jail. It stands in contrast to the
larger brick county jails, the most common type of historical jail in the state."

It is located on First Street (Georgia State Route 118) between Johnson and Thornton Streets in Bronwood.

References

National Register of Historic Places in Georgia (U.S. state)
Buildings and structures completed in 1900
Terrell County, Georgia